The 1980 Missouri Tigers football team represented the University of Missouri during the 1980 NCAA Division I-A football season.

Schedule
*Schedule Source:

Roster

References

Missouri
Missouri Tigers football seasons
Missouri Tigers football